Wacharapong Somcit (21 August 1975 – 1998) is a Thai association football goalkeeper who played for Thailand in the 1996 Asian Cup. At the end of the 1997 Southeast Asian Games in Indonesia, he died of colorectal cancer.

References

External links

11v11.com

1975 births
1998 deaths
Deaths from colorectal cancer
Wacharapong Somcit
Place of birth missing
Southeast Asian Games medalists in football
Wacharapong Somcit
Association football goalkeepers
Competitors at the 1993 Southeast Asian Games
Competitors at the 1995 Southeast Asian Games
1996 AFC Asian Cup players
Wacharapong Somcit
Competitors at the 1997 Southeast Asian Games
Wacharapong Somcit
Footballers at the 1994 Asian Games
Wacharapong Somcit
Deaths from cancer in Thailand